Inodrillia prolongata is a species of sea snail, a marine gastropod mollusk in the family Horaiclavidae.

It was previously included within the family Turridae.

Description
The length of the shell attains 6 mm, its diameter 2 mm.

The elongated, turreted shell contains 6–7 whorls, of which two in the protoconch. This species is remarkable for the great length of the spire in proportion to that of the short  aperture. Besides the 12 ribs, the surface exhibits fine wavy striae of growth. The inner lip is thin and slightly incrassate. The large sinus is deep. The columella is straight. The siphonal canal is wide and very short.

Distribution
This marine species occurs off St. Helena

References

External links

 Smith E.A. (1890). Report on the marine molluscan fauna of the island of St. Helena. Proceedings of the Zoological Society of London. 1890: 247-317, pl. 21-24

prolongata